Luděk Beneš is a retired slalom canoeist who competed fro Czechoslovakia from the mid-1950s to the mid-1960s. He won six medals at the ICF Canoe Slalom World Championships with three golds (C-1 team: 1955, 1959, 1965), two silvers (C-1: 1955, 1965) and a bronze (C-1 team: 1957).

References
 

Czechoslovak male canoeists
Czech male canoeists
Possibly living people
Year of birth missing (living people)
Medalists at the ICF Canoe Slalom World Championships